This is a list of Michigan State Spartans' varsity and club athletic team national championships and runner-up finishes.

Michigan State University has 29 varsity sports teams that compete under the Spartan nickname. The university participates in the NCAA's Division I and in the Big Ten Conference in all varsity sports. Michigan State offers 14 varsity sports for men and 15 for women.

The university's current interim athletic director is Bill Beekman, following the resignation of Mark Hollis.

MSU's Spartan Marching Band or Spartan Brass plays the fight song at every university event. Michigan State University was the first NCAA Division I athletic program to have multiple national championships in both football and basketball, as well as the only school to have multiple national championships in football, basketball, and hockey.

Varsity Team National Championships

 1939 - Men's Cross Country - NCAA 
 1948 - Men's Cross Country - NCAA 
 1949 - Men's Cross Country - NCAA 
 1951 - Boxing - NCAA 
 1951 - Football - No. 1 ranking by Billingsley, Helms, Poling
 1952 - Men's Cross Country - NCAA 
 1952 - Football - No. 1 ranking by AP, Billingsley, Boand, DeVold, Dunkel, Football Research, Helms, Litkenhous, NCF, Sagarin, UPI, Williamson 
 1955 - Boxing - NCAA 
 1955 - Men's Cross Country - NCAA 
 1955 - Football - No. 1 ranking by Boand
 1956 - Men's Cross Country - NCAA 
 1957 - Football - No. 1 ranking by Billingsley, Dunkel, Sagarin 
 1958 - Men's Cross Country - NCAA D1 
 1958 - Men's Gymnastics - NCAA 
 1959 - Men's Cross Country - NCAA D1 
 1965 - Football - No. 1 ranking by Berryman, DeVold, Dunkel, Football News, FWAA, Helms, Litkenhous, NFF, Poling, Sagarin, UPI 
 1966 - Football - No. 1 ranking by Football Research, Helms, NFF, Poling
 1966 - Men's Ice Hockey - NCAA 
 1967 - Men's Soccer - NCAA 
 1967 - Wrestling - NCAA D1 
 1968 - Men's Soccer - NCAA 
 1976 - Softball - AIAW
 1979 - Men's Basketball - NCAA D1 
 1986 - Men's Ice Hockey - NCAA D1 
 2000 - Men's Basketball - NCAA D1
 2007 - Men's Ice Hockey - NCAA D1
 2014 - Women's Cross Country - NCAA D1

Varsity Team National Runners-up
 1941 - Wrestling - NCAA
 1942 - Wrestling - NCAA
 1943 - Boxing - NCAA
 1948 - Boxing - NCAA
 1948 - Wrestling - NCAA
 1949 - Boxing - NCAA
 1950 - Boxing - NCAA
 1950 - Men's Cross Country - NCAA 
 1951 - Men's Swimming and Diving - NCAA
 1952 - Boxing - NCAA
 1957 - Men's Cross Country - NCAA
 1959 - Men's Ice Hockey - NCAA
 1960 - Men's Cross Country - NCAA D1 
 1964 - Men's Soccer - NCAA 
 1965 - Men's Soccer - NCAA 
 1970 - Wrestling - NCAA D1 
 1972 - Men's Indoor Track and Field - NCAA
 1972 - Wrestling - NCAA D1 
 1987 - Men's Ice Hockey - NCAA D1 
 2005 - Women's Basketball - NCAA D1
 2009 - Men's Basketball - NCAA D1

Basketball NCAA Final Four Appearances
 1957 - Men's Basketball - NCAA D1
 1979 - Men's Basketball - NCAA D1 (Champion)
 1999 - Men's Basketball - NCAA D1 
 2000 - Men's Basketball - NCAA D1 (Champion)
 2001 - Men's Basketball - NCAA D1 
 2005 - Men's Basketball - NCAA D1
 2005 - Women's Basketball - NCAA D1 (Runner-up)
 2009 - Men's Basketball - NCAA D1 (Runner-up)
 2010 - Men's Basketball - NCAA D1
 2015 - Men's Basketball - NCAA D1
 2019 - Men's Basketball - NCAA D1

Club Team National Championships
 1989 - Equestrian - Western - IHSA
 1990 - Equestrian - Western - IHSA (co-champion)
 1998 - Archery - Mixed Men and Women's Olympic Style - USCA USIAC
 1998 - Archery - Women's Olympic Style - USCA USIAC
 1999 - Roller Hockey - NCRHA
 2000 - Men's Water Polo - CWPA NCCC
 2000 - Roller Hockey - NCRHA
 2001 - Women's Water Polo - CWPA NCCC
 2002 - Women's Water Polo - CWPA NCCC
 2003 - Women's Ice Hockey - ACHA
 2005 - Men's Ice Hockey - ACHA D2
 2006 - Women's Water Polo - CWPA NCCC
 2006 - Men's Water Polo - CWPA NCCC
 2007 - MAPP Pompon
 2007 - MAPP High Kick Pompon
 2007 - Men's Ice Hockey - ACHA D2
 2008 - MAPP Pompon
 2008 - MAPP High Kick Pompon
 2008 - Men's Water Polo - CWPA NCCC
 2009 - MAPP High Kick Pompon
 2009 - MAPP Pompon
 2009-10 - Equestrian - Intermediate Flat - IHSA
 2010 - MAPP Pompon
 2010 - MAPP High Kick Pompon
 2011 - MAPP High Kick Pompon
 2011 - Women's Ice Hockey  - ACHA
 2012 - MAPP High Kick Pompon
 2012 - MAPP Pompon
 2012 - Men's Club Soccer NIRSA NCCS
 2012 - Women's Club Soccer NIRSA NCCS
 2013 - Men's Ice Hockey - ACHA
 2013 - MAPP High Kick Pompon
 2015 - Men's Ice Hockey D3 - ACHA
 2016 - MAPP High Kick Pompon
 2017 - MAPP High Kick Pompon
 2018 - MAPP Pompon
 2018 - Men's Lacrosse - MCLA D1
 2021 - Men's Water Polo - CWPA NCCC 

 2022 - Roller Hockey - NCRHA D2

Club Team National Runners-up
 1982 - Men's Bowling - USBC Collegiate
 1998 - Men's Bowling - USBC Collegiate
 1999 - Men's Ice Hockey - ACHA D2
 2000 - Women's Water Polo - CWPA NCCC
 2002 - Roller Hockey - NCRHA D1
 2002 - Synchronized Skating - USFA Collegiate Division
 2003 - Women's Water Polo - CWPA NCCC
 2003 - Roller Hockey - NCRHA D1 or Premier Division
 2005 - Men's Water Polo - CWPA NCCC
 2005 - Women's Ice Hockey - ACHA
 2006 - Roller Hockey - NCRHA D1
 2007 - Men's Water Polo - CWPA NCCC
 2007 - Men's Triathlon - USAT Collegiate Division
 2007 - Synchronized Skating - USFA Collegiate Division
 2010 - Women's Ice Hockey  - ACHA
 2011 - MAPP Pompon
 2013 - NCDA Dodgeball
 2013 - MAPP Pompon
 2013 - Roller Hockey NCRHA D1
 2014 - Roller Hockey NCRHA B (MSU Green)
 2014 - MAPP Pompon

Varsity Team Conference Championships

Fall Sports
Football
9 Big Ten Titles

2 Michigan Intercollegiate Athletic Association Titles

Men's Cross Country
14 Big Ten Titles

Women's Cross Country
6 Big Ten Titles

Field Hockey
4 Big Ten Titles

2 Big Ten Tournament Titles

Men's Soccer
1 Big Ten Title

 3 Big Ten Tournament Titles

Volleyball
2 Big Ten Titles

Winter Sports

Men's Basketball
 16 Big Ten Titles

 6 Big Ten Tournament Titles

Women's Basketball
3 Big Ten Titles

1 Big Ten Tournament Title

Men's Ice Hockey
 7 Central Collegiate Hockey Association Titles

2 WCHA Tournament Titles

5 Big Ten Titles

 11 CCHA Tournament Titles

Men's Indoor Track
3 Big Ten Titles

Men's Swimming
1 Big Ten Title

Wrestling
8 Big Ten Titles

Spring Sports

Baseball
4 Big Ten Titles

5 Michigan Intercollegiate Athletic Association Titles

Men's Golf
4 Big Ten Titles

Women's Golf
11 Big Ten Titles

Men's Outdoor Track
3 Big Ten Titles

15 Michigan Intercollegiate Athletic Association Titles

Women's Outdoor Track
1 Big Ten Title

Rowing
3 Big Ten Titles

Men's Tennis
2 Big Ten Titles

1 Michigan Intercollegiate Athletic Association Title

Women's Tennis
2 Big Ten Titles

Notes

External links
MSU Athletics

Championships
Michigan State Spartans championships